The slender tree frog (Litoria adelaidensis) is a tree frog native to south-western Australia.

Description
As suggested by its name, the slender tree frog has a very slender build. It has a thin, flat body with a flat, pointed snout. The dorsal surface varies in colour, from completely brown or green, to brown with green patches. The flanks of the body have a dark brown or black stripe, which runs from the back leg to the nostril; the line is much narrower between the nostril and the eye. The ventral surface is white, and the inside of the thighs have bright red spots. The tympanum is large and distinct. The fingers are mostly unwebbed and the toes are three-quarter webbed. They reach a length of 4.7 centimetres (1.9 in) from snout to vent.

Ecology and behaviour
Males call near a still water source to attract females; the call is a harsh "screech". Breeding occurs in early spring. The slender tree frog is found in permanent swamps and lagoons, often at the water's edge amongst the vegetation.

References

Litoria
Amphibians of Western Australia
Amphibians described in 1841
Taxa named by John Edward Gray
Frogs of Australia